Thamnobryum angustifolium, the Derbyshire feathermoss, is a species of moss in the Neckeraceae family. Threats include disturbance from cavers and climbers, collection by bryologists, pollution of the spring in which it grows, and desiccation during periods of drought. Its natural habitat is rivers.

Because of its extreme rarity and localised occurrence, the species has its own individual Biodiversity Action Plan and is included on a list of the world's most threatened bryophytes.

The plant is similar to the common Thamnobryum alopecurum, but can be distinguished from it by the structure of the branch leaves, which are narrower, very strongly toothed, parallel-sided and have a broad nerve. The leaves of T. cataractarum are less strongly toothed but they have an even broader nerve.

References

Endemic flora of England
Neckeraceae
Critically endangered plants
Environment of Derbyshire
Taxonomy articles created by Polbot